Justice Reeves may refer to:

John Reeves (judge) (born 1952), justice of the Supreme Court of the Northern Territory
John Reeves (activist) (1752–1829), first Chief Justice of Newfoundland
Reuben A. Reeves (1821–1908), justice of the Supreme Court of Texas

See also
Tamika Montgomery-Reeves (born 1981), associate justice of the Delaware Supreme Court
Judge Reeves (disambiguation)